Mark Alan Rasmussen (born 28 November 1983) is a midfielder who plays for Brisbane Premier League side Albany Creek Excelsior FC.

He started his career at Football League Championship outfit Burnley, who he joined after being spotted by scout Jack Hixon. He made his debut for the Clarets on 19 April 2003, replacing Matthew O'Neill. His second and final game for Burnley was a substitute appearance on 21 April 2003, when he replaced Gordon Armstrong. However, he was released at the end of the 2002-03 season by Stan Ternent.

He then moved to Accrington Stanley on a free transfer, but struggled to make the first team and ended up playing solely in the reserves. One year later, he moved on to non-league side Gateshead. He scored on his debut for the Tynesiders along with former Burnley teammate Anthony Shandran, but was transfer-listed straight after the match for talking to other clubs and failing to maintain a suitable level of fitness. He joined West Allotment Celtic and won the league and cup double in his first season with the club. He then joined Newcastle Benfield and was part of the league cup winning side in 2006 and who narrowly missed out on the first round of the FA Cup after a 1–0 home defeat by York City. He later moved down a division to join North Shields before moving onto Hebburn Town in the Northern League Division 1. Having moved to Brisbane, Australia, He played his first full season for Bayside United F.C in the Capital 1 League and finished runners up in 2013. A big summer transfer for Albany Creek Excelsior FC in the Brisbane Premier League took place and he awaits his debut on 22 Feb 2014.

After a short spell at Albany Creek, Mark moved to Brisbane side Holland Park Hawks in 2014 and went on to win the league and cup double. The 2015 season again saw the Hawks win the league and cup double and promotion to Brisbane's premier division.

References

External links
Mark Rasmussen profile

1983 births
Living people
Footballers from Newcastle upon Tyne
English footballers
Association football forwards
Burnley F.C. players
Accrington Stanley F.C. players
Gateshead F.C. players
West Allotment Celtic F.C. players
Newcastle Benfield F.C. players
North Shields F.C. players
Hebburn Town F.C. players
Bayside United FC players
Albany Creek Excelsior FC players
Holland Park Hawks FC players
English Football League players
Northern Premier League players
Northern Football League players